The Fowler's Vacola jar is a molded glass jar used in canning for food preservation. It is the most popular home canning system in Australia.

History
The system was developed in 1915 in Melbourne, Australia, by Joseph Fowler (28 February 1888 – 24 April 1972), who migrated from England in 1912, at his home in Hawthorn, Victoria, and became very popular.

The jar

The Fowler's Vacola system uses glass jars, single use rubber ring seals and pressed metal lids, much like American Mason jars first patented in 1858, except that the jars and lids are not threaded. During the canning process, while still hot (and presumably sterile), the lids are secured by metal tension clips which are removed once cooled and a vacuum seal has formed.

Other equipment marketed by the company included a large electrically heated waterbath and "sterilizing thermometer", a glass thermometer mounted on a concave stainless steel backing, graduated in both degrees Celsius and Fahrenheit.

Availability
Fowler's Vacola products are still produced by the original Fowlers Vacola company, and are available from some hardware stores, and directly from the company via their online store. Used equipment is frequently sold on online auction sites and in opportunity shops.

The company
Fowlers Vacola specialises in bottling jams and other foods at its manufacturing plant in Sydney.

See also
 Kilner jar
 Screw cap
 Sterilization (microbiology)
 Weck jar

References

External links
Preserving Tradition
Fowlers Vacola Company Website

Glass jars
Canned food
Food storage containers